José Lopes da Silva may refer to:

 Gabriel Mariano (José Gabriel Lopes da Silva, 1928–2002), Cape Verdean poet, novelist, and an essayist
 José Lopes da Silva (poet) (1872–1962), Cape Verdean professor, journalist and poet